Monkey Kingdom is an independent British television production company based in London, United Kingdom, with offices in Los Angeles. Established by David Granger and Will Macdonald in 2000, the company was acquired by NBCUniversal International Networks in 2010. Monkey was NBC Universal's third UK production venture following the acquisition of Carnival and the launch of WTTV, NBC Universal's joint venture with Working Title Films’ Tim Bevan and Eric Fellner.

The company creates, develops, produces, and sells entertainment and factual programming in the United Kingdom and the United States. It produces contents in various genres, including live studio, structured reality, factual, documentary, entertainment and scripted comedy, as well as digital and brand-driven content.

These include BAFTA-winning structured reality show Made in Chelsea, reality/quiz hybrid The Question Jury (best Daytime Programme 2017), BAFTA-nominated iconic music entertainment show TFI Friday, Comedy Award-winning studio variety show The Charlotte Church Show, RTS-winning The Real Housewives of Cheshire, Focal Award-nominated Elton John: Me, Myself & I, Mental Health Award documentary series The House of Obsessive Compulsives, and two Rose D’Or-winners: hidden camera fixed-rig comedy show Make My Day, and comedy sketch series Swinging.

The company has received several nominations and awards from BAFTA, Rose d'Or, International Emmy, RTS Award, The Comedy Awards and Broadcast Awards for their productions. These include the award-winning structured reality TV show Made in Chelsea, TFI Friday, Elton John: Me, Myself & I, award-winning game show The Question Jury and The Real Housewives of Cheshire.

Monkey has produced shows for the BBC, ITV, Channel 4, Channel 5, Sky, E4, 5Star, ITVBe, All 4, MTV, Trouble, ABC, Bravo, E!, TBS, TruTV, GSN, The WB, TV Land, Huffington Post, Bebo, IKEA, Orange, Sony Ericcson and Amnesty International.

Prior to founding Monkey, David Granger and Will Macdonald produced International Emmy/BAFTA/Rose d'Or-winning Don't Forget Your Toothbrush, TFI Friday, The Priory, Lock, Stock..., MTV's Most Wanted and The Big Breakfast.

Programmes produced by Monkey Kingdom

2021

2020

2018

2017

2016

2015

2014

2013

2012

2011

2010

2009

2008

2007

2006

2005

2004

2003

2002

Awards & Nominations
2019

Winner - British LGBT Awards (The Bi Life)

Nominated - RTS Awards: Best Entertainment Show (Don't Hate The Playaz)

2018

Nominated - TRIC Awards: Reality Show (Made in Chelsea)

Nominated - TRIC Awards: Reality Show (The Real Housewives of Cheshire)

Nominated - O2 Media Awards: Best Entertainment Programme (Tanya's Extreme Therapies)

Nominated - RTS Awards: Best Daytime Programme (The Question Jury)

2017

Winner - Broadcast Awards: Best Daytime Programme (The Question Jury)

Winner - RTS Awards North West: Best Entertainment Programme (The Real Housewives of Cheshire)

Nominated - Broadcast Awards: Best Music Programme (TFI Friday)

Nominated - RTS Awards: Best Daytime Programme (The Question Jury)

Nominated - TRIC Awards: Satellite/Digital Programme (Made in Chelsea)

Nominated - Televisual Bulldog Awards: Panel, Quiz or Chat Show (The Question Jury)

Nominated - Format Awards: Best Studio-based Gameshow Format (The Question Jury)

2016

Nominated - BAFTA: Entertainment Programme (TFI Friday Anniversary Special)

2015

Winner - Music Week Sync Awards: Most Shazamed TV Show (Made in Chelsea)

2014

Winner - Music Week Sync Awards: TV Show: Entertainment - Live Performance (Made in Chelsea)

Nominated - TV Choice Awards: Best Reality Show (Made in Chelsea)

Nominated - National Reality Television Awards: Best Entertainment (Made in Chelsea)

Winner - Broadcast Digital Awards: Best Game (Made in Chelsea game)

Nominated - TRIC Awards: Satellite/Digital Programme (Made in Chelsea)

2013

Winner - BAFTA: Reality & Constructed Factual (Made in Chelsea)

Nominated - Broadcast Digital Awards: Best Entertainment Programme (Made in Chelsea)

Nominated - TV Choice Awards: Best Reality Show (Made in Chelsea)

Nominated - National Reality Television Awards: Best Entertainment (Made in Chelsea)

2012

Winner - National Reality Television Awards: Best Reality Non-Competitive Show (Made in Chelsea)

Winner - National Reality Television Awards: Personality of the Year (Spencer Matthews - Made in Chelsea)

Winner - National Reality Television Awards: Best Female Personality (Millie Mackintosh - Made in Chelsea)

Nominated - BAFTA: Reality & Constructed Factual (Made in Chelsea)

Nominated - TV Choice Awards: Best Reality Show (Made in Chelsea)

2010

Winner - Thinkbox: Best Advert January/February (IKEA)

2008

Nominated - Rose d'Or: Best Entertainer, Montreux International Television Festival (The Charlotte Church Show)

Nominated - Focal Awards: Best Use of Footage in an Entertainment Programme (Elton John: Me, Myself & I)

2007

Winner - Glamour (magazine): TV Personality of the Year (The Charlotte Church Show)

Nominated - Televisual Bulldog Awards: Best Panel/Chat Show (The Charlotte Church Show)

Winner - Rose d'Or: Best Female Comedy Performance, Montreux International Television Festival (Swinging)

2006

Winner - British Comedy Awards: Best Newcomer (The Charlotte Church Show)

Nominated - Mental Health Awards: Best TV Documentary (House of Obsessive Compulsives)

2004

Nominated - Rose d'Or, Montreux International Television Festival (SWAG)

Nominated - Rose d'Or, Montreux International Television Festival: Best Pilot (Ex-Rated)

2003

Winner - Rose d'Or, Montreux International Television Festival: Best Gameshow (Make My Day)

Nominated -  Rose d'Or, Montreux International Television Festival: Best Reality (Make My Day)

References 

NBCUniversal
Television production companies of the United Kingdom
2000 establishments in the United Kingdom